Nurafshon (formerly: Kim) is a town in northern Tajikistan near the Uzbekistan border. It is located in Sughd Region, and is part of the city of Isfara.

Notes

References

External links
Satellite map at Maplandia.com

Populated places in Sughd Region